Condylactis is a genus of cnidarians belonging to the family Actiniidae.

The genus has almost cosmopolitan distribution.

Species:

Condylactis aurantiaca 
Condylactis gigantea 
Condylactis kerguelensis 
Condylactis parvicornis

References

Actiniidae
Hexacorallia genera